Viehhofen is a municipality in the district of Zell am See (Pinzgau region), in the state of Salzburg in Austria.

The town lies at an elevation of 856 m above sea level  in the middle of Glemmtal Valley, through which flows the River Saalach. The valley's main town is our western neighbor, Saalbach-Hinterglemm. To the east, at the entrance to the valley, you will find the village of Maishofen.

The valley is flanked by the Kitzbühel Alps, better known here as the "Pinzgau Grass Mountains".
The following mountains surround the village:
to our SW, the Oberer Gernkogel (elev. 2,175 m) - highest point in Viehhofen
to our SE, the Schmittenhöhe (1,965 m)
to our NE, the Sausteige (1,912 m) - which is also the origin of the animal displayed on our coat-of-arms, the boar.

Population

References

Cities and towns in Zell am See District